A sign is an object, quality, event, or entity whose presence or occurrence indicates the probable presence or occurrence of something else. A natural sign bears a causal relation to its object—for instance, thunder is a sign of storm, or medical symptoms a sign of disease. A conventional sign signifies by agreement, as a full stop signifies the end of a sentence; similarly the words and expressions of a language, as well as bodily gestures, can be regarded as signs, expressing particular meanings. The physical objects most commonly referred to as signs (notices, road signs, etc., collectively known as signage) generally inform or instruct using written text, symbols, pictures or a combination of these.
 
The philosophical study of signs and symbols is called semiotics; this includes the study of semiosis, which is the way in which signs (in the semiotic sense) operate.

Nature
Semiotics, epistemology, logic, and philosophy of language are concerned about the nature of signs, what they are and how they signify.  The nature of signs and symbols and significations, their definition, elements, and types, is mainly established by Aristotle, Augustine, and Aquinas. According to these classic sources, significance is a relationship between two sorts of things: signs and the kinds of things they signify (intend, express or mean), where one term necessarily causes something else to come to the mind. Distinguishing natural signs and conventional signs, the traditional theory of signs (Augustine) sets the following threefold partition of things:
all sorts of indications, evidences, symptoms, and physical signals, there are signs which are always signs (the entities of the mind as ideas and images, thoughts and feelings, constructs and intentions); and there are signs that have to get their signification (as linguistic entities and cultural symbols). So, while natural signs serve as the source of signification, the human mind is the agency through which signs signify naturally occurring things, such as objects, states, qualities, quantities, events, processes, or relationships. Human language and discourse, communication, philosophy, science, logic, mathematics, poetry, theology, and religion are only some of fields of human study and activity where grasping the nature of signs and symbols and patterns of signification may have a decisive value. Communication takes place without words but via the mind as a result of signs and symbols; They communicate/pass across/ messages to the human mind through their pictorial representation.

Types 

The word sign has a variety of meanings in English, including:
 Sun signs in astrology
 Sign or signing, in communication: communicating via hand gestures, such as in sign language.
 Gang signal
 Sign, in Tracking (hunting): also known as Spoor (animal); trace evidence left on the ground after passage.
 A signboard.
 A sign, in common use, is an indication that a previously observed event is about to occur again
 Sign, in divination and religion: an omen, an event or occurrence believed to foretell the future
 Sign, in ontology and spirituality: a coincidence or surprising event thought to reveal divine will; see synchronicity
 Sign (linguistics): a combination of a concept and a sound-image described by Ferdinand de Saussure
 In mathematics, the sign of a number tells whether it is positive or negative. Also, the sign of a permutation tells whether it is the product of an even or odd number of transpositions.
 Signedness, in computing, is the property that a representation of a number has one bit, the sign bit, which denotes whether the number is non-negative or negative.  A number is called signed if it contains a sign bit, otherwise unsigned. See also signed number representation
 Sign, in biology: an indication of some living thing's presence
 Medical sign, in medicine: objective evidence of the presence of a disease or disorder, as opposed to a symptom, which is subjective
 Sign (semiotics): the basic unit of meaning
 Information sign: a notice that instructs, advises, informs or warns people
 Traffic sign: a sign that instructs drivers; see also stop sign, speed limit sign, cross walk sign
 Sign, in a writing system: a basic unit. Similar terms which are more specific are character, letter or grapheme
 Commercial signage, including flashing signs, such as on a retail store, factory, or theatre
 Signature, in history: a handwritten depiction observed on a document to show authorship and will
 For marketing or advocacy purposes, a signage refers to the collective use of signs to convey a message.

Christianity 

St. Augustine was the first man who synthesized the classical and Hellenistic theories of signs. For him a sign is a thing which is used to signify other things and to make them come to mind (De Doctrina Christiana (hereafter DDC) 1.2.2; 2.1.1). The most common signs are spoken and written words (DDC 1.2.2; 2.3.4-2.4.5). Although God cannot be fully expressible, Augustine gave emphasis to the possibility of God's communication with humans by signs in Scripture (DDC 1.6.6).  Augustine endorsed and developed the classical and Hellenistic theories of signs.  Among the mainstream in the theories of signs, i.e., that of Aristotle and that of Stoics, the former theory filtered into the works of Cicero (106-43 BC, De inventione rhetorica 1.30.47-48) and Quintilian (circa 35–100, Institutio Oratoria 5.9.9-10), which regarded the sign as an instrument of inference.  In his commentary on Aristotle's De Interpretatione, Ammonius said, "according to the division of the philosopher Theophrastus, the relation of speech is twofold, first in regard to the audience, to which speech signifies something, and secondly in regard to the things about which the speaker intends to persuade the audience." If we match DDC with this division, the first part belongs to DDC Book IV and the second part to DDC Books I-III. Augustine, although influenced by these theories, advanced his own theological theory of signs, with whose help one can infer the mind of God from the events and words of Scripture.

Books II and III of DDC enumerate all kinds of signs and explain how to interpret them. Signs are divided into natural (naturalia) and conventional (data); the latter is divided into animal (bestiae) and human (homines); the latter is divided into non-words (cetera) and words (verba); the latter is divided into spoken words (voces) and written words (litterae); the latter is divided into unknown signs (signa ignota) and ambiguous signs (signa ambigua); both the former and the latter are divided respectively into particular signs (signa propria) and figurative signs (signa translata), among which the unknown figurative signs belong to the pagans.
In addition to exegetical knowledge (Quintilian, Institutio Oratoria 1.4.1-3 and 1.8.1-21) which follows the order of reading (lectio), textual criticism (emendatio), explanation (enarratio), and judgment (iudicium),  one needs to know the original language (Hebrew and Greek) and broad background information on Scripture (DDC 2.9.14-2.40.60).

Augustine's understanding of signs includes several hermeneutical presuppositions as important factors. First, the interpreter should proceed with humility, because only a humble person can grasp the truth of Scripture (DDC 2.41.62). Second, the interpreter must have a spirit of active inquiry and should not hesitate to learn and use pagan education for the purpose of leading to Christian learning,  because all truth is God's truth (DDC 2.40.60-2.42.63). Third, the heart of interpreter should be founded, rooted, and built up in love which is the final goal of the entire Scriptures (DDC 2.42.63).

The sign does not function as its own goal, but its purpose lies in its role as a signification (res significans, DDC 3.9.13). God gave signs as a means to reveal himself; Christians need to exercise hermeneutical principles in order to understand that divine revelation. Even if the Scriptural text is obscure, it has meaningful benefits. For the obscure text prevents us from falling into pride, triggers our intelligence (DDC 2.6.7), tempers our faith in the history of revelation (DDC 3.8.12), and refines our mind to be suitable to the holy mysteries (DDC 4.8.22). When interpreting signs, the literal meaning should first be sought, and then the figurative meaning (DDC 3.10.14-3.23.33). Augustine suggests the hermeneutical principle that the obscure Scriptural verse is interpreted with the help of plain and simple verses, which formed the doctrine of "scriptura scripturae interpres" (Scripture is the Interpreter of Scripture) in the Reformation Era. Moreover, he introduces the seven rules of Tyconius the Donatist to interpret the obscure meaning of the Bible, which demonstrates his understanding that all truth belongs to God (DDC 3.3.42-3.37.56). In order to apply Augustine's hermeneutics of the sign appropriately in modern times, every division of theology must be involved and interdisciplinary approaches must be taken.

See also

 Asemic writing
 Roland Barthes
 Commercial signage
 Mary Douglas
 Semiotic theory of Charles Sanders Peirce
 Icon
 Icon (computing)
 Ideogram
 Interpretation of dreams
 Edmund Leach
 Claude Lévi-Strauss
 List of symbols
 Logotype
 Map-territory relation – view that an abstraction derived from something, or a reaction to it, is not the thing itself.
 Sorites paradox
 Theseus' paradox
 Identity of indiscernibles
 National symbol
 Neon sign
 Religious symbolism
 Representation
 Ferdinand de Saussure
 Semiotics
 Signing (disambiguation)
 Structuralism
 Symbol
 Synchronicity
 Traffic sign
 Universal language

References

External links 

 

Communication
Semiotics